Yiyang railway station, may refer to:

 Yiyang railway station (Jiangxi), in Yiyang County, Jiangxi, China
 Yiyang railway station (Hunan), in Yiyang, Hunan, China